Porthcawl Comprehensive School, on the western side of Porthcawl town in Bridgend County Borough, has approximately 1,500 pupils, ages 11–18 and 80 teaching staff. The headteacher is Mr M Stephens
Ruth Jones and Rob Brydon attended this school. The chairperson of governing body is A. Thomas.

See also
:Category:People educated at Porthcawl Comprehensive School

References

External links
Official Site

Secondary schools in Bridgend County Borough
Porthcawl